Akpınar is a village in the Merzifon District, Amasya Province, Turkey. Its population is 180 (2021).

History  
The people of the village are Lurs.

References

Villages in Merzifon District